Dans Branch is a stream in eastern Crawford County in the U.S. state of Missouri. It is a tributary of Courtois Creek.

The namesake of Dans Branch is unknown.

See also
List of rivers of Missouri

References

Rivers of Crawford County, Missouri
Rivers of Missouri